Toy Symphony may refer to:

 Toy Symphony, a musical composition of unknown authorship dated to the 1760s
 Toy Symphony (Arnold) (1957), a musical composition by Malcolm Arnold
 Toy Symphony (play) (2007), by Malcolm Gow